{{DISPLAYTITLE:C9H11NO4}} 
The molecular formula C9H11NO4 (molar mass: 197.19 g/mol) may refer to:

 D-DOPA
 L-DOPA (or levodopa)

Molecular formulas